Leeroy Thornhill (born 8 October 1968) is a British electronic music artist and formerly a rave dancer and occasionally keyboardist for the British electronic group the Prodigy. Thornhill's live performances throughout the 1990s included his unique style of shuffling.

He has also recorded under the names Longman and Flightcrank.

Life and work
Thornhill was born in Barking but raised in Rayne near Braintree in Essex, and grew up as a football and James Brown fan.

He joined the Prodigy along with Keith Flint and Maxim Reality after they met Liam Howlett at a local rave club The Barn. Both were dancers for the band's live show. Thornhill's height is 6 feet 7 inches, compared to Flint who was 5 feet 7 inches (170 cm).

In 2000, Thornhill left the band and went on to record various solo EPs under the names "Longman" and "Flightcrank"; however, these projects never saw any substantial success.

He now DJs at large venues and is still in touch with the Prodigy. During the Prodigy's "Their Law" tour Thornhill was the DJ support act at several venues. He also works as a regular DJ. He also remixed tracks for other artists, such as the Italian Subsonica's "Nuvole Rapide".

Thornhill had worked with Hyper, appearing on their live shows. He appeared at the V Festival in 2007 in Chelmsford, Essex.

His latest project is the creation of nu skool breaks record label Electric Tastebuds. He has recently signed breakbeat group The Wrongstar Society to the label.

In October 2008, a music video was created for "Everything U Need", a track by Thornhill's Smash Hi-Fi project. The video was directed by Philip Carrer and Bleeding Apple.

Videography
Thornhill appeared in numerous music videos during his time as a member of the Prodigy.

Music videos
 "Charly" (1991)
 "Everybody in the Place" (1991)
 "Fire" (1992)
 "Out of Space" (1992)
 "Wind It Up" (1993)
 "One Love" (1993) (CGI likeness and photographs, no physical appearance)
 "No Good (Start the Dance)" (1994)
 "Voodoo People" (1994)
 "Poison" (1995)
 "Firestarter" (1996)
 "Breathe" (1996)

Video albums
Electronic Punks (1995)

Discography

Singles & EPs
 Lowrise EP 12" (1993)
 The Longman EP 12" (1996)
 Flightcrank EP CD Ltd & 2×7" Ltd (2000)
 Inside Out (Original Version) / Outside In 10", Ltd (2000)
 Amazing CD & 12" (2001)
 What U Need CD & 12" (2001)
 Wait for Me / Breaking Out Digital Download (2018)
 The Calling / Vibrations Digital Download (2018)

References

1968 births
Living people
English keyboardists
English electronic musicians
English techno musicians
Hardcore techno musicians
Big beat musicians
Black British musicians
Remixers
Club DJs
The Prodigy members
People from Barking, London
Musicians from London
Musicians from Essex
People from Braintree District
English people of Jamaican descent
English people of Mauritian descent